This is a list of fantasy films released in the 2010s. Films listed include live action and animated.

List

References 

2010s
Lists of 2010s films by genre